Wrapped In Ribbon is Canadian Idol finalist Theresa Sokyrka's Christmas album, released for purchase online on November 5, 2007.

Album information
The album has 8 tracks, including a song by Reid Jamieson previously featured on his album The Unavoidable Truth called "Last Day Of The Year" as well as a duet with Matt Dusk called "Baby, It's Cold Outside."

Promotion
Currently the album is only available for purchase online, at Credit Union banks in Saskatchewan as well as Saskatoon bookseller McNally Robinson.

Track listing
 "The Christmas Song"
 "Have Yourself A Merry Little Christmas"
 "Let It Snow"
 "Last Day Of The Year" - cover of a song by Reid Jamieson
 "What Are You Doing New Year's Eve?"
 "White Christmas"
 "Winter Wonderland"
 "Baby, It's Cold Outside" (Duet with Matt Dusk)

2007 albums
Theresa Sokyrka albums
MapleMusic Recordings albums